Vittorio Zoboli (born June 24, 1968 in Bologna, Italy) is an Italian racing driver. His career has spanned Formula One, Formula Three, Formula 3000 and sports car racing, in addition to two appearances in the Formula One Indoor Trophy.

Career

Kart
1980-1984 Karting 3rd Classified 100 Super European Championship; 1st Classified 100 Super International Cup, 2nd Classified 100 Cadets Italian Championship, 3rd Classified 100 National Italian Championship, 2nd Classified 100 Cadets Italy-France.

Formula Four
1987 Vittorio won Italian Championship with 7 race wins.

Formula Three
1988 Best Rookie in Formula Three with Team Cevenini sponsor Nike's driver. Vittorio Zoboli's Marlboro driver, competed in the Italian Formula Three Championship for 1989, driving a Dallara chassis run by the Forti Corse team.  He finished in sixteenth place in the drivers' championship, with two points to his name.

Formula 3000
Zoboli moved up to the British Formula 3000 series for 1990, driving for the GA Motorsport team.  He scored two podium finishes and set a fastest lap on his way to fifth position overall.

At the end of the season, he took part in the final two rounds of the more prestigious International Formula 3000 season, again with GA Motorsport.  However, he failed to qualify in both of these appearances.  He moved to the Junior Team outfit for the 1991 season, competing in the first eight of the championship's ten rounds and qualifying for five of them, but failing to score any points.  Another move, to the one-car Advance Racing team, for 1992 brought about an improvement to thirteenth in the championship with three points. He also finished in fourth position in the season-opening, non-championship F3000 World Cup event held at the Autódromo Juan y Oscar Gálvez. He then moved to the ambitious Il Barone Rampante team for 1993, but it folded mid-season without Zoboli scoring any points.

Formula One
1994 FORMULA 1 Test Driver Team Jordan. Despite being left without a permanent drive until 1995, Zoboli made an appearance at the Formula One Indoor Trophy in 1993, driving for the Jordan team alongside regular team member Rubens Barrichello.  In the preliminary rounds he scored enough points to beat BMS Scuderia Italia drivers Michele Alboreto and Fabrizio Barbazza, but was then knocked out by his team-mate in the semi-finals.  He did, however, take third place after defeating Alboreto again in an additional race for the position.

He returned to the event in 1995 after it was not held the previous year.  On this occasion, he returned to his F3 employer Forti (now an F1 team) alongside Andrea Montermini and Giovanni Lavaggi, but was knocked out in the preliminary rounds.

Sports car racing
With his single-seater career petering out, Zoboli turned to sports car racing.  His début in the category came in 1995, when he competed in two rounds of the BPR Global GT Series in a Jolly Club-run Ferrari F40 1st Classified GP Estoril - 2nd Classified GP Nurburgring.  He then competed in the Lamborghini GTR Supertrophy between 1997 and 2002, with 7 victories and numerous podium placements, 2nd Classified in Championship 2001.

Between 2002 and 2004 he competed in nine rounds of the FIA GT Championship, driving a Ferrari 550 Maranello for the Force One Racing with David Halliday and Philippe Alliot and Wieth Racing teams. In 2006 he drove in the FIA GT3 Lamborghini Gallardo Team Reiter co-driver Albert II Thurn und Taxis, finishing in fourth position.

Squadra Corse Automobili Lamborghini
2012 – 2013 Automobili Lamborghini Blancapain Supertrofeo - General manager 
2009 – 2011 Automobili Lamborghini Blancapain Supertrofeo - Coordination

Racing record

Career summary

Complete International Formula 3000 results
(key) (Races in bold indicate pole position) (Races in italics indicate fastest lap)

External links
Official website (under construction) 
Vittorio Zoboli career details at driverdb.com
FIA GT Championship website profile

1968 births
Living people
Italian racing drivers
Italian Formula Three Championship drivers
International Formula 3000 drivers
British Formula 3000 Championship drivers
FIA GT Championship drivers
Sportspeople from Bologna
24 Hours of Spa drivers